The 2014 Enugu Government House Attack was carried out on 8 March 2014, when members of the militant group Biafra Zionist Federation took control of the state house for about 4 hours and erected the flag of Biafra at the entrance of the house.  The leader of the group Barrister Benjamin Onwuka gave Nigerians living in Biafran territory an ultimatum to vacate their land before 31 March 2014 or face the bloodbath that will come afterward. 

It was initially reported that another pro-Biafran militant group MASSOB was responsible for the attack, but this information was later discarded after BZF claimed responsibility for the attack. Benjamin Onwuka was arrested by the Nigeria Police Force after attempting to carryout a similar attack on Enugu State Broadcasting Service.

See also 
 2014 Enugu State Broadcasting Service attack

References

Biafra
Military coups in Nigeria
Military history of Nigeria
Political history of Nigeria
Enugu Government House attack
Enugu Government House attack
Enugu Government House attack, 2014
Attacks on buildings and structures in Nigeria
Enugu Government House attack